A shopping street or shopping district is a designated road or quarter of a city/town that is composed of individual retail establishments (such as stores, boutiques, restaurants, and shopping complexes). Such areas will typically be pedestrian-oriented, with street-side buildings, wide sidewalks, etc.

They may be located along a designated street, or clustered in mixed-use commercial area within the city. In larger cities, there may be multiple shopping streets or districts, often with distinct characteristics each. Often times, businesses in these areas will be represented by a designated business improvement association.

Below is a list of shopping streets and districts by city.

Africa

Cameroon
 Yaounde — Avenue Kennedy
 Douala — Avenue Ahmadou Ahidjo, Boulevard de la liberté

Egypt
 Cairo — Khan el-Khalili, Al-Hussein Area
 Alexandria — Manshiya, Berkleley
 Sharm El-Sheikh — Naama Bay, Shark's Bay

Ghana
 Accra — Oxford Street

Morocco
 Casablanca — Place des shopping places

South Africa
 Johannesburg — Rosebank, Sandton
 Cape Town — Cape Gate, Long Street, Tyger Valley

Tunisia
 Tunis — Berges du Lac

Asia

Armenia
Yerevan — Northern Avenue

Azerbaijan

Baku — Neftchilar Avenue, Nizami Street
Ganja — Javad Khan Street

Bangladesh
Dhaka — Gulshan

Georgia
Tbilisi — Rustaveli Avenue

China

 Beijing — Wangfujing, Xidan, Guomao, Zhongguancun, Sanlitun, Silk Street
 Chongqing — Ciqikou, Guanyinqiao, Jiefangbei, Nanping, Shapingba
 Shanghai — Nanjing Road, Avenue Joffre, People's Square, Zikawei, Lujiazui, The Bund, Wujiaochang, Avenue Petain, Hongqiao, Xintiandi, Tianzifang, Zhujiajiao, Qibao, Xinzhuang, North Sichuan Road

Fujian
Xiamen — Zhongshan Road, Xiahe Road, Gulangyu Island

Guangdong
Guangzhou — Shangxiajiu Pedestrian Street
Shenzhen — Shennan Road, The MixC
Hong Kong
Causeway Bay — Russell Street
Central — Chater Road
Tsim Sha Tsui — Canton Road
Jiangsu
Suzhou — Ligongdi, Lake Jinji, Shiquan Street, Canglang, Pingjiang Road
Liaoning
Dalian — Qingniwaqiao, Xi'an Road, Heping Square
Shaanxi
Xi'an — Eastern Street
Shandong
Qingdao — Taidong

Sichuan
Chengdu — Chunxilu, Hongxinglu (close to Chunxilu)
Zhejiang
Hangzhou — Wulin Square, Euro Street, Hubin Road, The MixC
Ningbo — Tianyi Square

India

 Chandigarh — Sector 17
 Delhi — Aerocity, Connaught Place, Khan Market, Nehru Place, Select City Walk, South Extension

Andhra Pradesh

 Guntur — Brindavan Gardens, Brodipet, Chandramoulinagar, Lakshmipuram
 Nellore — Kapu Street
 Vijayawada — Eluru Road, Mahatma Gandhi Road (aka Bandar Road), PVP Square, Trendset Mall
 Visakhapatnam — Daba Gardens, Dwaraka Nagar, Jagadamba Centre, Town Kotha Road, VIP Road, Waltair Main Road

Gujarat

 Ahmedabad — C. G. Road, S.G. Highway, Ashram Road

Haryana

 Gurgaon — DLF CyberCity, Mehrauli Gurgaon Road

Karnataka

 Bangalore — 100 Feet Road, Brigade Road, Chinmaya Mission Hospital Road, Commercial Street, Jayanagar 4th Block Shopping Complex, Mahatma Gandhi Road, UB City

Kerala

 Thiruvananthapuram — Chala, Connemara Market, East Fort, Keston Road, Kowdiar, Mahatma Gandhi Road, Pettah, Thampanoor
 Kochi — Mahatma Gandhi Road
 Kozhikode — Court Road, Mavoor Road, Palayam, Sweetmeat Street

Madhya Pradesh

 Gwalior — Maharaj Bada, Naya Bazaar

Maharashtra

 Buldhana — Kavri Chowk
 Mumbai — Bhendi Bazaar, Chira Bazaar, Chor Bazaar, Colaba + Colaba Causeway, Crawford Market, Dadar, Dava Bazaar, Dharavi, Fashion Street, Fort, Hindmata, Hiranandani Gardens, Kemps Corner, Lalbaug, Lamington Road, Linking Road, Lohar Chawl, Lower Parel, Mahim, Mangaldas Market, Matunga, Natraj Market, New Marine Drive, Null Bazaar, Princess Street, Sion (Gandhi Market), Tardeo, Walkeshwar, Zaveri Bazaar
 Navi Mumbai — Nerul, Sanpada, Vashi
 Pune — Appa Balwant Chowk (aka ABC), Mahathma Phule Mandai, MG Road, Tulshibaug

Punjab

 Amritsar — Lawrence Road
 Ludhiana — Mall Road

Rajasthan

 Jaipur — Badi Chaupar, Chandpol, Chhoti Chaupar, Bapu Bazaar, Johari Bazaar,

Tamil Nadu

 Chennai — Pondy Bazaar, Grand Southern Trunk Road, Khader Nawaz Khan Road, Nelson Manickam Road, Ranganathan Street, South Usman Road, Usman Road
 Coimbatore — Avinashi Road, Diwan Bahadur Road, Race Course, R.S. Puram
Telangana
 Hyderabad — Abids, Banjara Hills, Koti

Uttarakhand

 Dehradun — Rajpur Road

Uttar Pradesh

 Allahabad — Civil lines
 Lucknow — Gomtinagar, Hazratganj
 Varanasi — Maldahiya

West Bengal

 Kolkata — Camac Street, Esplanade, Gariahat, New Market, Park Street

Indonesia
Bandung — Jalan Cihampelas, Jalan Riau, Jalan Braga
Jakarta — Pasar Baru, Satrio Shopping Belt
Medan — Kampung Madras, Kesawan
Yogyakarta — Malioboro

Iran
Ahvaz — Kian Pars
Isfahan — Tohid Street
Kerman — 1001 Shab Street, Emam Hossein Boulevard
Mashhad — Ahmad Abad Avenue, Sajad Boulevard
Sari — Saat Square, Enghelab Street, Qaran Street, Tabarsi Street, Farhang Avenue
Tehran — Valiasr Street, Jomjuri-e Eslami Street, Gandi Street, Mirdamad Boulevard, Maadar Square, Vanak Square, Pasdaran

Israel
Jerusalem — Downtown Triangle (Jaffa Road, King George Street, Ben Yehuda Street), Emek Refaim, Malha, Mamilla Mall, Talpiot

Japan

Fukuoka — Nakasu, Tenjin
Hiroshima — Kamiyachō, Hacchōbori, Hondori Street
Kawasaki — Kawasaki
Kobe — Harborland, Nankinmachi (Kobe Chinatown), Motomachi, Sannomiya
Kyoto — Shijō Street (Gion, Shijō Kawaramachi, Shijō Karasuma), Pontochō, Shin-Kyōgoku Street
Nagoya — Meieki (district around Nagoya Station), Sakae, Kanayama
Osaka — Midōsuji, Minami area (America-mura, Dōtonbori, Horie, Namba, Nipponbashi, Shinsaibashi, and Sennichimae), Tennōji, Umeda
Saitama — Ōmiya, Urawa
Sapporo — Odori Park, Tanuki Kōji
Sendai — Ichibanchō, Chuō Street
Tokyo — Aoyama, Asakusa, Daikanyama, Ebisu, Ginza, Harajuku, Ikebukuro, Jiyugaoka, Nihonbashi, Omotesandō, Roppongi, Shibuya, Shimokitazawa, Shinjuku, Yūrakuchō
Western Tokyo — Kichijōji, Machida, Tachikawa, Hachiōji
Yokohama — Minato Mirai 21, Motomachi, Yokohama Chinatown

Kuwait
Kuwait City — Salmiya - Salem Al-Mubarak Street

Lebanon

Beirut — Beirut Central District, Hamra Street, Rue Verdun, Achrafieh, Dbayeh, Beirut Souks
Jounieh — Kaslik
Tripoli — Rue El Mina
Zahlé — Central Boulevard

Malaysia
Kuala Lumpur — Bukit Bintang, Bangsar, Petaling Street (China Town), Brickfields (Little India), Jalan Masjid India, Jalan Tuanku Abdul Rahman (Batu Road), Chow Kit Road
Malacca — Jalan Merdeka
Penang — King Street, Queen Street, Market Street (Little India), Burma Road, Gurney Drive
Selangor — Mutiara Damansara

Nepal
Chitwan — Narayangarh
Kathmandu — Durbar Marg, New Road, Sundhara
Lalitpur — Kumaripati
Pokhara — Chipledhunga, Lakeside

Pakistan
Faisalabad — D Ground, Susan Road
Islamabad — F-6 Markaz, Blue Area, F 10 Markaz, The Centaurus
Karachi — Zamzama Boulevard, Tariq Road, Zaibunissa Street, Hyderi
Lahore — M.M. Alam Road, Mall Road, Main Boulevard
Rawalpindi — Commercial Market, Murree Road, Centrum Plaza

Philippines

Metro Manila
Manila - Divisoria, Quiapo, Manila, Binondo
Makati - Ayala Center
Parañaque - Baclaran
Pasig - Tiendesitas
Quezon City - Araneta Center, Triangle Park (Quezon City) 
San Juan - Greenhills
Taguig - Bonifacio High Street

Cordillera
Baguio - Session Road

Visayas
Cebu City - Cebu Business Park, Colon Street

Davao
Davao City - J.P. Laurel Avenue

Saudi Arabia
Jeddah — Tahlia Street, Prince Sultan Street, Palestine Street (Telecommunications), Al-Balad
Riyadh — Tahlia Street, Olaya Street

Singapore
Singapore — Orchard Road, Bras Basah Road, Eu Tong Sen Street, Hill Street, Victoria Street, North Bridge Road-South Bridge Road
Bugis — Bugis Junction, Bugis+

South Korea

Busan — Gwangbok-dong, Nampo-dong, Seomyeon, Centum City
Daegu — Dongseongno
Daejeon — Eunhaeng-dong, Dunsan
Gwangju — Chungjangno, Geumnamno, Sangmu
Seoul — Myeongdong, Namdaemun Market, Jongno, Insa-dong, Daehangno, Dongdaemun Market, Apgujeong, Cheongdam, Itaewon, Gangnam, Samseong-dong, Yongsan, Sinchon, Hongdae, Yeongdeungpo

Thailand
Bangkok — Ratchaprasong, Sukhumvit Road, Thong Lor, Siam Square, Si Lom, Victory Monument, Ladprao, Ratchada, Chatuchak, Wang Lang, Bang Lumphu - Khao San Road, Phahurat - Sampeng, Bobae
Chiang Mai — Changkran Road, Nimmanhemin Rd
Hat Yai — Kimyong Market, Niphat Uthit 1st, 2nd, 3rd Roads, Sanehanusorn Road
Pattaya — Beach Road
Patong — Patong Beach Road
Si Racha — Si Racha Nakorn Road

Turkey

 Adana — Ziyapaşa Boulevard
 Ankara — Tunali Hilmi Street, 7th Street, Atatürk Boulevard, Gazi Mustafa Kemal Boulevard, Ankara, Mithatpasa Avenue,
 Antalya — Işıklar Avenue, Konyaaltı Avenue
 Bolu — İzzet Baysal Avenue
 Bursa — Çekirge Street, Fatih Sultan Mehmet Boulevard, Cumhuriyet Avenue
 Diyarbakır — Ofis Street
 Istanbul — Abdi İpekçi Avenue, Bağdat Avenue, İstiklal Avenue
 İzmir — Plevne Street, Kıbrıs Şehitleri Street, Kemeraltı
 Kocaeli — Fethiye Avenue
 Sakarya — Çark Avenue
 Samsun — Çiftlik Street
 Trabzon — Uzun Street, Kahramanmaraş Avenue
 Van — İskele Avenue
 Yalova — Yalı Avenue, Gazi Paşa Avenue

Vietnam
Ho Chi Minh City (Saigon) — De Tham Street, Dong Khoi Street, Ly Tu Trong Street, Nguyen Trai Street

Europe

Austria

Salzburg — Getreidegasse
Vienna — Mariahilfer Straße, Neubaugasse, Favoritenstraße, Graben, Kohlmarkt, Kärntnerstraße
Graz — Herrengasse

Belgium

Antwerp — Meir, Schuttershofstraat, Huidevettersstraat, Leopoldstraat, Kelderstraat
Bruges — Steenstraat
Brussels — Avenue Louise/Louizalaan, Avenue de la Toison d'Or /Guldenvlieslaan, Rue Neuve, Chaussée d'Ixelles / Elsenesesteenweg, Chaussée de Waterloo/ Waterloosesteenweg, Boulevard Anspach / Anspachlaan
Charleroi — Rive Gauche
Ghent — Veldstraat
Kortrijk — Korte Steenstraat, Lange Steenstraat
Knokke — Lippenslaan
Namur — rue de Fer

Bosnia and Herzegovina
Banja Luka — Gospodska
Sarajevo — Titova, Ferhadija and Sarači

Bulgaria

Burgas — Aleksandrovska Street
Plovdiv — Batenberg Street
Sofia — Vitosha Boulevard, Graf Ignatiev Street, Shishman Street
Varna — Knyaz Boris 1 Boulevard

Croatia
Dubrovnik — Stradun
Split — Riva, Marmontova
Zagreb — Ilica

Cyprus
 

Nicosia - Makarios Avenue, Stasikratous Street, Ledra Street, Onasagorou Street
Limassol - Makarious III Avenue, Anexartisias Street, Agiou Andreou Street
Larnaca - Ermou Street
Paphos - Makariou III Avenue, Gladstonos Street, Ermou Street, Nikodemou Mylona Street
Famagusta - University Avenue

Czech Republic 
Prague — Pařížská Street, Na Příkopech Street

Denmark
Aarhus — Strøget
Copenhagen — Strøget
Odense — Vestergade

Finland

Helsinki — Aleksanterinkatu, Esplanadi
Kuopio — Kauppakatu
Mariehamn — Torggatan
Porvoo — Jokikatu
Tampere — Hämeenkatu

France

Bordeaux — Rue Sainte-Catherine
Brest — Rue de Siam
Caen — Rue Saint-Pierre
Cannes — Promenade de la Croisette, Rue d'Antibes
Grenoble — Rue Félix Poulat, Place Grenette, Grande Rue, Rue de Bonne
Le Havre — Rue de Paris; Avenue René Coty
Lille — Vieux Lille, Euralille
Lyon — Place Bellecour, Rue du Plat, Rue de la République, Rue Édouard Herriot, Rue Émile Zola
Marseille — Cours Saint-Louis, Rue Saint-Ferréol, Rue Paradis, Rue Sainte, Place Lulli and Rue Grignan
Metz — Rue Serpenoise, Rue des Clercs, Rue du Palais, Rue de la Tête d'Or, Rue Taison, Rue des Jardins, En Fournirue, En Chaplerue
Montpellier — Rue de la Loge, Place de la Comédie
Nancy — Rue Saint-Jean, Rue Saint-Georges, Rue Saint-Dizier, Rue Gambetta, Rue Stanislas, Rue Raugraff, Place Henri Mengin
Nantes — Rue de Verdun, Rue de la Marne, Rue de la Barillerie, Rue d'Orléans, Place Royale, Passage Pommeraye, Rue Crébillon, Place Graslin, Rue de la Fosse
Nice — Avenue Jean-Médecin, Rue Paradis, Avenue de Verdun
Paris — Champs-Élysées, Boulevard Haussmann, Rue de Rivoli, Boulevard des Capucines, Rue du Faubourg Saint Honoré, Avenue Montaigne, Avenue George V, the axis formed by Rue de Castiglione, Place Vendôme, Rue de la Paix and Place de l'Opéra, Rue de Sèvres, Rue du Bac, Rue des Francs-Bourgeois (along with other streets in Le Marais), as well as segments of Boulevard Saint-Germain and Rue de Rennes near Saint-Germain-des-Prés
Rouen — Rue Jeanne d'Arc, Rue du Gros Horloge
Saint-Étienne — Place Dorian, Rue du Général Foy, Rue Gambetta
Saint-Tropez — Quai Jean Jaurès, Quai Suffren
Strasbourg — Grande Île
Toulouse — Rue Saint-Rome
Tours — Rue Nationale, Place Jean Jaurès

Germany

 Berlin — Tauentzienstraße, Kurfürstendamm, Schloßstraße, Friedrichstraße
 Bochum — Kortumstraße
 Bremen — Obernstraße
 Cologne — Hohe Straße, Schildergasse
 Dortmund — Westenhellweg
 Dresden — Prager Straße, Königstraße
 Duisburg — Königstraße
 Düsseldorf — Schadowstraße, Königsallee
 Erfurt — Anger
 Essen — Kettwiger Straße
 Flensburg — Holm
 Frankfurt — Zeil, Neue Kräme, Roßmarkt, Goethestraße
 Hamburg — Mönckebergstraße, Spitalerstraße, Neuer Wall, Große Bleichen, Jungfernstieg
 Hannover — Georgstraße, Bahnhofstraße
 Karlsruhe — Kaiserstraße
 Kassel — Königsstraße
 Kiel — Holstenstraße, Dänische Straße
 Leipzig — Petersstraße, Grimmaische Straße
 Mannheim — Planken
 Munich — Kaufingerstraße, Neuhauser Straße, Theatinerstraße, Maximilianstraße
 Mönchengladbach — Hindenburgstraße
 Nuremberg — Karolinenstraße
 Stuttgart — Königstraße
 Wiesbaden — Wilhelmstraße, Kirchgasse

Greece
Athens — Voukourestiou Street, Ermou Street, Panepistimiou Street, Kifissia around Kasavetis Street and Levidou Street
Corfu — George Theotokis Street
Patras — Riga Feraiou Street
Thessaloniki — Tsimiski Street, Mediterranean Cosmos

Hungary
Budapest — Andrássy Avenue, Váci utca, Deák utca
Szeged — Kárász Street,

Ireland
Cork — St. Patrick's Street, Oliver Plunkett Street
Drogheda — West Street
Dublin — Grafton Street, Henry Street, O'Connell Street, Wicklow Street, North Earl Street
Galway — Shop Street
Limerick — O'Connell Street
Swords — Main Street

Iceland
Reykjavík — Laugavegur

Italy

Bari — Via Sparano, Corso Vittorio Emanuele, Corso Cavour
Bergamo — Via XX Settembre, Via Gerolamo Tiraboschi, Via Zambonate, Via Giorgio e Guido Paglia, Viale Papa Giovanni XXIII
Bologna — Via Farini
Brescia — Corso Palestro, Corso Magenta, Via San Martino della Battaglia
Cagliari — Via Manno, Via Garibaldi
Catania — Via Etnea, Corso Italia
Capri — Via Camerelle
Florence — Via dei Calzaiuoli, Via della Vigna Nuova, Via Roma, Via de' Tornabuoni, Piazza della Repubblica
Genoa — Via Roma, Via XX Settembre, Via Luccoli, Via San Vincenzo, Via San Luca, Via XXV Aprile,
La Spezia — Corso Cavour, Via Prione, Via Chiodo
Livorno — Via Ricasoli, Via Grande
Lecce — Piazza Mazzini, Corso Vittorio Emanuele II
Milan — Corso Vittorio Emanuele II, Via Montenapoleone, Corso Giacomo Matteotti, Galleria Vittorio Emanuele, Via della Spiga, Corso di Porta Romana, Corso Italia, Corso Venezia, Piazza San Babila, Via Manzoni, Via San Pietro all'Orto, Via Sant'Andrea, Via Verri, Corso Vercelli, Corso Buenos Aires
Naples — Via Toledo, Via Chiaia, Piazza de' Martiri, Via Calabritto, Via Scarlatti,Via G. Filangieri, Via dei Mille
Padua — Via San Fermo, Via Altinate, Piazza Garibaldi, Via Santa Lucia, Via Cavour
Palermo — Via Ruggero Settimo, Viale della Libertà, Via Roma
Pisa — Corso Italia, Borgo Stretto
Rome — Via Cola di Rienzo, Via dei Condotti, Via Frattina, Via del Babuino, Via del Corso, Via Veneto
Salerno — Corso Vittorio Emanuele, Via Mercanti, Via dei Principati
Torino — Via Roma, Via Garibaldi, Via Lagrange, Via Po, Via Carlo Alberto, Via XX Settembre
Taranto — Via Tommaso D'Aquino, Via Acclavio, Via Pupino
Taranto — Via Di Palma
Venezia — Piazza San Marco, Calle Larga XXII Marzo, Calle Valaresso, Salizada San Moisé
Verona — Via Mazzini, Corso di Porta Borsari, Via Cappello, Piazza Erbe

Latvia
Riga — Dzirnavu iela, Elizabetes iela, Terbatas iela

Lithuania
Kaunas — Laisvės alėja
Vilnius — Gedimino prospektas

Luxembourg
Luxembourg City — Groussgaass

Montenegro
Podgorica — Slobode Street, Džordža Vašingtona Boulevard

Netherlands

's-Hertogenbosch — Hinthamerstraat, Markt
Amsterdam — Haarlemmerdijk, Kalverstraat, Rokin, Leidsestraat, Negen Straatjes, Utrechtsestraat, P.C. Hooftstraat
Arnhem — Ketelstraat, Steenstraat
Eindhoven — Demer
Haarlem — Grote Houtstraat
The Hague — Grote Marktstraat, Spuistraat
Leiden — Breestraat, Haarlemmerstraat
Maastricht — Grote Staat, Stokstraat
Rotterdam — Beurstraverse, Coolsingel, Hoogstraat, Lijnbaan

North Macedonia
Bitola — Širok Sokak
Skopje — Macedonia Street, Old Bazaar, Bit pazar

Norway
Bergen — Strandgaten, Torgallmenningen
Oslo — Karl Johans gate, Bogstadveien, Torggata, Markveien
Trondheim — Nordre gate

Poland
Gdańsk — Długi Targ Mariacka
Gdynia — Świętojańska
Katowice — 3 maja Stawowa Staromiejska Mielęckiego Mariacka
Kielce — Sienkiewicza
Krakow — Floriańska Grodzka Sienna
Łódź — Piotrkowska Street
Poznań — Półwiejska Święty Marcin Plac Wolności
Sopot — Bohaterów Monte Cassino
Toruń — Szeroka
Warsaw — Nowy Świat Marszałkowska Świętokrzyska Aleje Jerozolimskie Chmielna
Wroclaw — Świdnicka Oławska Kuznicza  Szewska
Zakopane — Krupówki

Portugal
Coimbra — Ferreira Borges Street, Visconde da Luz
Figueira da Foz — Rua da República
Lisbon — Rua Augusta, Avenida da Liberdade, Rua Garrett, Rua do Ouro, Chiado, Baixa Pombalina, Rua do Carmo, Rossio
Porto — Rua de Santa Catarina
Póvoa de Varzim — Rua da Junqueira, Avenida Mouzinho de Albuquerque

Romania

Bucharest — Calea Victoriei, Bulevardul Magheru, Bulevardul Nicolae Bălcescu
Cluj-Napoca — Bulevardul Eroilor, Piaţa Unirii, Bulevardul Regele Ferdinand
Constanţa — Strada Ștefan cel Mare, Bulevardul Tomis, Bulevardul Alexandru Lăpuşneanu
Oradea — Calea Republicii

Russia

Kazan — Baumana Street, Pushkina Street, Kremlyovskaya Street
Krasnodar — Krasnaya Street
Moscow — Tverskaya Street area (including Kuznetsky Most, Stoleshnikov Lane and Tverskoy Boulevard); Petrovka Street, Tretyakov Drive, Arbat Street, Novy Arbat Street, Kutuzovsky Prospekt, Leninsky Avenue
Rostov-on-Don — Bolshaya Sadovaya Street
Saint Petersburg — Nevsky Prospekt (Staryi Nevsky Prospect), Liteyny Prospekt, Garden Street, Bolshoi Prospekt Petrogradskoy Storony
Sochi — Navaginskaya Street, Vorovskogo Street, Democraticheskaya Street
Volgograd — Lenin Avenue, Raboche-Krestiyanskaya Street
Yekaterinburg — Prospekt Lenina, Kuybysheva Street

Serbia
Belgrade — Knez Mihailova

Slovakia
Bratislava — Obchodna Street

Spain

A Coruña — Calle Real, Plaza de Lugo, Calle Barcelona
Barcelona — Portal de l'Àngel, Carrer de la Portaferrissa Passeig de Gràcia, Rambla Catalunya, Avinguda Diagonal, Carrer de Pelai, Carrer de Sants
Granada — Calle Recogidas
Las Palmas de Gran Canaria — Calle Mayor de Triana
Logroño — Calle Laurel (es)
Madrid — Calle Serrano y Calle José Ortega y Gasset both in Barrio de Salamanca, Gran Vía, Calle Fuencarral, Calle Mayor, Calle del Carmen, Calle Preciados
Málaga — Calle Marqués de Larios
Marbella — Avenida Ramón y Cajal, Avenida Ricardo Soriano
Seville — Calle Tetuán, Calle Sierpes
Puerto Banús — Muelle Ribera
Valencia — Carrer Colón, Carrer En Joan d'Àustria
Vigo — Calle Principe, Calle Urzaiz, Calle Gran Via

Sweden
Malmö — Södra Förstadsgatan
Gothenburg — Avenyn
Stockholm — Drottninggatan, Götgatan, Birger Jarlsgatan, Biblioteksgatan

Switzerland
Basel — Freie Strasse, Gerbergasse, Steinenvorstadt, Marktplatz, Eisengasse
Bern — Old City (i.e., Marktgasse, Spitalgasse, and Kramgasse)
Geneva — "Les Rues Basses" (i.e., Rue de la Confédération, Rue du Marché, Rue de la Croix d'Or and Rue de Rive), Rue du Rhône
Gstaad — Promenade
Lausanne — Rue de Bourg, Place St. Francois, Rue St. Francois, Rue du Pont, Place de la Palud, Rue Saint Laurent, Rue Haldimand, Flon
Lugano — Via Nassa, Via Pessina
Lucerne — Old City (Hertensteinstrasse, Weggisgasse, Kappelgasse), Schwanenplatz, Grendelstrasse
St. Gallen — Multergasse, Marktgasse, Neugasse, Spisergasse, Marktplatz
St. Moritz — Via Serlas, Via Maistra
Winterthur — Untertor, Marktgasse
Zermatt — Bahnhofstrasse
Zürich — Bahnhofstrasse, Rennweg, Strehl-/Storchengasse, Löwenstrasse, Limmatquai, Niederdorfstrasse

Ukraine
 Kyiv — Khreschatyk
 Lviv — Freedom Prospect

United Kingdom

England

Bath — Burton Street, Milsom Street, New Bond Street, Old Bond Street, Stall Street, Southgate Street, SouthGate Place, Union Street
Birkenhead — Grange Road, Borough Road, Woodchurch Road
Birmingham — Corporation Street, New Street, Bullring, The Mailbox
Brighton — The Lanes, North Laine
Bristol —  Broadmead, Queen's Promenade (Triangle), Whiteladies Road
Canterbury — High Street
Coventry — Smithford Way, The Precinct, Market Way, Hertford Street, Broadgate, Cross Cheaping, West Orchards, Cathedral Lanes
Durham — Elvet Bridge, Saddler Street, Market Place, High Street (Prince Bishops Shopping Centre), Silver Street, The Gates Shopping Centre
Kingston upon Hull — Prospect Street, the Prospect Centre, Paragon Street, Carr Lane, Whitefriargate
Leeds — Victoria, Briggate, Kirkgate Market, King Edward Street, The Headrow, Trinity, White Rose, Leeds Dock
Leicester — Belvoir Street, Gallowtree Gate, High Street, Humberstone Gate, Silver Street
Liverpool — Bold Street, Church Street, Lord Street, Williamson Square, Liverpool One Area (including Paradise Street, Peter's Lane and South John Street), Whitechapel, Castle Street
London — West End shopping district (including Bond Street, Oxford Street, Savile Row, Jermyn Street, Piccadilly and Regent Street), Knightsbridge area (including Sloane Street), Kings Road, Covent Garden area (including Neal Street, Long Acre and Seven Dials), Notting Hill (including Westbourne Grove), Royal Exchange
Manchester — Market Street, Oldham Street, King Street, Deansgate, Exchange Square, New Cathedral Street
Newcastle upon Tyne — Northumberland Street, Grainger Town
Nottingham — Bridlesmith Gate
Oxford — Cornmarket Street, Clarendon Shopping Centre, Golden Cross, High Street, Queen Street, Westgate Shopping Centre, Broad Street
Portsmouth — Gunwharf Quays, Commercial Road
Sheffield — Devonshire Quarter, Fargate, The Moor, Meadowhall Centre
Southampton — Above Bar Street
Swindon — The Parade, Regent Street
York — The Shambles

Northern Ireland
Belfast — Royal Avenue, High Street, Donegall Place

Scotland
Aberdeen — Union Street
Edinburgh — Multrees Walk, George Street, Princes Street, St James Centre
Glasgow — Buchanan Street, Argyle Street, Sauchiehall Street, Princes Square, Merchant City district including Ingram Street
Perth — High Street

Wales
Cardiff — Queen Street, St. Mary Street/High Street, The Hayes
Newport — Commercial Street
Swansea — Oxford Street

North America

Canada

Alberta
Calgary — Stephen Avenue, Uptown 17th Avenue, Kensington, Marda Loop, Downtown East Village
Edmonton — Whyte Avenue, Ice District, South Edmonton Common
British Columbia
Langley — Glover Road (in Fort Langley)
 Vancouver — Alberni District, Broadway (Midtown), Burrard Street, Commercial Drive, Cambie Street, Davie Village, Granville District, Granville Island, Kitsilano, Robson Street, SOMA, Uptown
Victoria — LoJo (Lower Johnson)
Whistler — Village Stroll
Manitoba

 Winnipeg — Exchange District, Osborne Village, St. James Street

Nova Scotia
Halifax — Spring Garden Road
Ontario
Hamilton — Hess Village
London — Richmond Row
Ottawa — Bank Street, Byward Market, Elgin Street, Rideau Street, Sussex Drive, Wellington West, Westboro
 Toronto — Downtown Yonge, Fashion District, Gerrard India Bazaar, Kensington Market, Midtown Toronto, Mink Mile (Bloor Street), Orfus Road, Queen West, Roncesvalles, Yorkville
Quebec
 Montreal — Golden Square Mile, Mount Royal Avenue, Saint Catherine Street, Saint Denis Street, Saint Laurent Boulevard
Quebec City — Saint Jean Street, Saint Joseph Street, Grande Alley, Cartier Avenue, Laurier Boulevard

Costa Rica
Escazú — Avenida Escazu, Guachipelín, Multiplaza Escazu
San José — Avenida Central, Rohrmoser

Dominican Republic
Santiago de los Caballeros — Avenida Juan Pablo Duarte, La Esmeralda, Los Jardines Metropolitanos
Santo Domingo — Avenida Winston Churchill, Piantini

Guatemala
Guatemala City — Avenida Reforma, Zona Viva, Cuatro Grados Norte

Mexico
 Acapulco — La Costera, Acapulco Diamante, Acapulco Dorado, Marqués Port, Pichilingue
 Cancún — Kukulcán Avenue
 Guadalajara — Andares, Puerta de Hierro
 Los Cabos — La Marina
 Mexico City — Paseo de la Reforma, Avenida Presidente Masaryk, Francisco I. Madero Avenue, Nuevo Polanco, Altavista Street, Santa Fe
 Monterrey — Calzada del Valle
 Puebla — Angelópolis, Zavaleta/La Noria, Las Animas, La Paz/La Calera
 Tuxtla Gutiérrez — Boulevard Belisario Domínguez, Boulevard Ángel Albino Corzo

Panama
Panama City — Calle 50, Soho Mall, Multiplaza, Punta Pacifica

United States

Alabama
Birmingham — Summit Boulevard, Galleria Boulevard

Arizona
 Phoenix — Camelback Road
Prescott — Montezuma Street
Scottsdale — Downtown Scottsdale, North Scottsdale Road
Tempe — Mill Avenue
Tucson — East Skyline Drive, Fourth Avenue, Crossroads Festival

Arkansas
Little Rock — Markham Avenue, Chenal Boulevard

California

Berkeley — 4th Street, Shattuck Avenue, Solano Avenue, Telegraph Avenue
Beverly Hills — Rodeo Drive, Beverly Drive
Burlingame — Burlingame Avenue
Carmel — Ocean Avenue
Costa Mesa — South Coast Metro, South Coast Plaza
Glendale — North Brand Boulevard
Grass Valley — Mill Street
Laguna Beach — Forest Avenue
 Los Angeles — Abbot Kinney Boulevard, Melrose Avenue, Sunset Strip, Fairfax District, Miracle Mile, Robertson Boulevard, Sawtelle Boulevard, Sawtelle Japantown, Wilshire Boulevard
Los Gatos — Santa Cruz Avenue
Newport Beach — Newport Center
Oakland — College Avenue, Piedmont Avenue
Palm Desert — El Paseo
Palo Alto — University Avenue, Stanford Shopping Center
Pasadena — Old Town Pasadena
Placerville — Main Street
Roseville — Galleria at Roseville
Sacramento — Downtown Commons, Arden Fair
Santa Clarita — Old Town Newhall, Westfield Valencia Town Center
 San Diego — Ocean Beach Antique District, Gaslamp Quarter
 San Francisco — Union Square, Union Street, Chestnut Street, Haight-Ashbury, Fillmore Street, Hayes Street
San Jose — The Alameda, Santana Row, Stevens Creek Boulevard
Santa Barbara — State Street
Santa Monica — Montana Avenue, Third Street Promenade, Main Street

Colorado
Aspen — Galena Street
Boulder — Pearl Street Mall
 Denver — 16th Street Mall, LoDo, Cherry Creek

Connecticut
Greenwich — Greenwich Avenue
Westport — Main Street

Delaware
Bethany Beach — The Boardwalk, Garfield Parkway
Lewes — 2nd Street, Front Street
Newark — East Main Street
Rehoboth Beach — Rehoboth Avenue, The Boardwalk, Delaware Route 1
Wilmington — Riverfront, Route 202, W 11th Street

Florida
Coral Gables — Miracle Mile
Delray Beach — Atlantic Avenue
Boca Raton. Dezer Park, Downtown Boca
Ft. Lauderdale — Las Olas 
 Miami — Miami Design District, Coconut Grove, Flagler Street, Aventura Mall, Bal Harbour Shops
Miami Beach — Lincoln Road, Collins Avenue, Washington Avenue, Ocean Drive, Española Way, Alton Road
 Orlando — Disney Springs, International Drive, Universal CityWalk
Naples — 5th Avenue South, Third Street South
Palm Beach — Worth Avenue
 Tampa — Soho, Westshore
Winter Park — Park Avenue

Georgia
 Atlanta — Luckie Marietta, Peachtree Street, Buckhead, Atlantic Station
Dunwoody and Sandy Springs — Perimeter Center
Savannah — Savannah Historic District, Abercorn Common, Abercorn Walk, Oglethorpe Mall

Hawaii

 Honolulu — Ala Moana, Kalakaua Avenue, Kuhio Avenue (Waikiki)

Idaho
Boise — Downtown Boise, Hyde Park
Caldwell — Indian Creek Plaza
Meridian — The Village at Meridian
Nampa — Historic Downtown Nampa

Illinois
Chicago — Magnificent Mile, Michigan Avenue, Oak Street, State Street, Wicker Park, Clybourn Corridor, Bucktown, Gold Coast, Lincoln Park

Indiana
Indianapolis — 82nd/86th Street Corridor, Massachusetts Avenue, Broad Ripple

Kansas
Kansas City — Village West
Lawrence — Massachusetts Street
Manhattan — Aggieville
Overland Park — Santa Fe Drive
Wichita — Old Town

Kentucky
Louisville — Oxmoor Mall, The Paddock Shops
Lexington — Fayette Mall

Louisiana
 New Orleans — Royal Street, Magazine Street, Canal Street

Maryland
Annapolis — Main Street
 Baltimore — Fells Point, Harbor East, Aliceanna Street
Chevy Chase — Wisconsin Avenue

Massachusetts
 Boston — Newbury Street, Boylston Street, Copley Square, Downtown Crossing, Charles Street
 Cambridge — Harvard Square, Central Square, Inman Square
 Somerville — Davis Square, Union Square, Assembly Square

Michigan

 Detroit — Lower Woodward Avenue, Greektown, Eastern Market
Birmingham — Old Woodward Avenue
Frankenmuth — South Main Street
Grosse Pointe — The Village on Kercheval Avenue
Rochester — Main Street
Royal Oak — Main Street
Northville — W. Main Street
Plymouth — Main Street
Traverse City — Front Street

Minnesota
Duluth — Superior Street
 Minneapolis — Nicollet Mall, Uptown
 St. Paul — Grand Avenue

Missouri

 Branson — 76 Country Boulevard
 Clayton — Central Business District
 Kansas City — Country Club Plaza
 Saint Charles — Main Street
 Saint Louis — Central West End, South Grand, U City Loop, Cherokee Street

Nebraska
 Omaha — The Old Market
Lincoln — "O" Street

Nevada
 Las Vegas — Las Vegas Strip
Reno — Virginia Street
Sparks — Victorian Square

New Jersey
 Collingswood — Haddon Avenue
 Haddonfield — Haddon Avenue, King's Highway
 Hudson County — Bergenline Avenue, Journal Square
 Atlantic City — The Boardwalk, Pacific Avenue, The Walk (Atlantic, Arctic, Baltic, Michigan, and Arkansas Avenues)
 Montclair — Upper Montclair
 Princeton — Nassau Street
 Ridgewood — East Ridgewood Avenue
 Westfield — Downtown
 Englewood — North Dean Street

New Mexico
Albuquerque — Uptown

New York

 New York City — Fifth Avenue, Madison Avenue, 57th Street, Seventh Avenue, SoHo, West Village, South Street Seaport, Columbus Circle, Arthur Avenue, Fordham Plaza, Bronx, The Hub, Bronx
 Albany — Downtown, Central Avenue, Wolf Road, New Louden Road, Colonie Center, Stuyvesant Plaza
 Binghamton — Vestal Parkway
 Buffalo — Elmwood Avenue, BoHo, Hertel Avenue, Walden Galleria, Williamsville, Market Arcade
 Rochester — Park Avenue, Monroe Avenue, University Avenue
 Syracuse — Armory Square, Destiny USA
Saratoga Springs — Broadway, Railroad Place
Westchester — Galleria at White Plains, The Westchester
Hempstead — Franklin Avenue
East Hampton — Main Street, Newtown Lane
Southampton — Main Street Jobs Lane

North Carolina
 Charlotte — SouthPark, Sharon Road, Northlake, Rea Road
 Raleigh — North Hills, Glenwood Avenue, Oberlin Road
Greensboro — Friendly Avenue, Green Valley Road
Winston-Salem — Stratford Road, Hanes Mall Boulevard
 Durham — Fayetteville Road, Southpoint
Asheville — Biltmore Village, Tunnel Road
Wilmington — Front Street, Mayfaire, Oleander Drive
Greenville — Red Banks Road, Arlington Boulevard
Chapel Hill/Carrboro — Franklin Street

Ohio
 Akron — West Market Street
 Cincinnati — Over the Rhine, 5th Street, Hyde Park Square, O'Bryonville, Montgomery Road (between Hartfield Place and Schoolhouse Lane) 
 Cleveland — Euclid Avenue, Mayfield Road, Cedar Road, Chagrin Boulevard, Crocker Park, Great Northern Boulevard
 Columbus — New Bond Street, High Street, Lane Avenue, Polaris Parkway, Easton Town Center
 Toledo — Monroe Street, Fallen Timbers, Levis Commons
 Oxford — High Street

Oklahoma
Edmond — Spring Creek, Broadway
 Oklahoma City — Automobile Alley, Classen Curve, Nichols Hills Plaza, Park Avenue, Plaza District, Uptown, Western Avenue
Norman — Campus Corner
 Tulsa — Brookside, Utica Square, Cherry Street
 Broken Arrow — The Rose District

Oregon
Bend — Old Mill District
 Portland — Northwest District, Pearl District, Pioneer Place

Pennsylvania
Allentown — Hamilton District
Harrisburg — SoMa District (Downtown)
Lower Merion — Bala Village Shopping District, Suburban Square
 Philadelphia — Rittenhouse Square, Walnut Street, Old City, Fashion District
 Pittsburgh — Fifth & Forbes District of Downtown, Walnut Street and Ellsworth Avenue in Shadyside, Forbes Avenue in Squirrel Hill
State College — Downtown/College Avenue
Upper Merion — King of Prussia Mall

Rhode Island
 Providence — Westminster Street, Thayer Street, Wayland Square, Wickenden Street
Newport — Thames Street

South Carolina
 Charleston — King Street
Myrtle Beach — Broadway at the Beach and Barefoot Landing
Greenville, SC — Main Street

Tennessee
 Gatlinburg — US 441 Parkway
 Knoxville — Cumberland Avenue, Old City, Kingston Pike, Parkside Drive
 Nashville — Green Hills, The Gulch, Rivergate
 Memphis — Peabody Place, Poplar Avenue
 Pigeon Forge — Dolly Parton Parkway
 Sevierville — Dolly Parton Parkway

Texas
 Austin — 2nd Street District, South Congress, The Domain, Sixth Street, Rainey Street
 Dallas — The Knox District, West Village, Victory Park, Uptown Dallas, Highland Park Village, Northpark Center, Deep Ellum Galleria Dallas District, Preston Center, Snyder Plaza
El Paso — The Fountains at Farah
 Fort Worth — Camp Bowie Boulevard, Sundance Square, West 7th Street
Galveston — Strand Historic District
 Houston — Westheimer Road, Uptown Houston, Rice Village, Upper Kirby, Highland Village, CityCentre, GreenStreet, Memorial City District, West Avenue, Harwin Drive, Downtown Houston, Uptown Park, BLVD Place, River Oaks District
 San Antonio — San Antonio River Walk, The Shops at La Cantera, North Star Mall

Utah
Park City — Main Street
Provo — Center Street
St. George — St. George Boulevard, Main Street
 Salt Lake City — Main Street, Sugar House, Gateway District, 9th and 9th

Virginia
 Alexandria — King Street in Old Town Alexandria
 Arlington — Wilson and Clarendon Boulevards in Clarendon, Pentagon City
 Fairfax County — Tysons Corner, Reston Town Center, Fair Oaks
 Richmond — Carytown, Stony Point Fashion Park
 Virginia Beach — Town Center, Lynnhaven

Washington
Bellingham — Railroad Avenue, Fairhaven
Bellevue — Bellevue Square, Old Bellevue Main Street
 Seattle — Westlake Center and 5th Avenue, Broadway and Pike/Pine in Capitol Hill, First Avenue in Belltown, The Ave in the University District. Market Street and Ballard Avenue in Ballard, Fremont, The Junction in West Seattle, Phinney/Greenwood, Columbia City, Pioneer Square
 Tacoma — Sixth Avenue, Pacific Avenue
Port Townsend — Water Street
Kirkland — Lake Street

Washington, D.C.

 Chinatown — H & I Streets between 5th & 8th Streets, Gallery Place Metro Station
 Dupont Circle — Connecticut Avenue
Georgetown — Wisconsin Avenue & M Street, and Washington Harbour at K Street NW between 30th and 31st Streets
 Friendship Heights — Wisconsin Avenue near Maryland state line
 Penn Quarter — F Street NW, between 5th & 10th Streets

West Virginia

Wisconsin
 Madison — State Street
 Milwaukee — Historic Third Ward
 Wisconsin Dells — Broadway, Outlets at the Dells

South America

Argentina
 Buenos Aires — Palermo, Puerto Madero, Recoleta, Florida Street, Avenida Santa Fe, Avenida Alvear, Córdoba Avenue
 Córdoba — 9 de Julio Street, Rafael Núñez Avenue, Recta Martinolli Avenue, Vélez Sarsfield Avenue
 Rosario — Cordoba Street
 Mar del Plata — Güemes Street

Brazil
 Botucatu — Rua Amando de Barros, Avenida Vital Brasil
 Curitiba — Rua XV de Novembro (Centro), Avenida Batel, Rua Comendador Araújo, Al. Dr. Carlos de Carvalho
 Rio de Janeiro — Leblon, Rua Garcia d'Ávila (Ipanema)
 São Paulo — Avenida Paulista, Rua Oscar Freire, Rua Bela Cintra, Rua Haddock Lobo Rua João Cachoeira and Rua Voluntários da Pátria.
 Vitoria — Avenida Chapot Presvot, Aleixo Neto, Princesa Isabel

Bolivia
 La Paz — San Miguel neighborhood (mainly Montenegro Av./21st Street)
 Santa Cruz de la Sierra — Equipetrol (Aka "Fashion Street")

Chile
 Santiago — Alonso de Córdova Avenue, Isidora Goyenechea, Nueva Costanera

Colombia
Amazonian Region
 Leticia — Three Boundaries Square, Brazil Boundary.
 Florencia — Bello Horizonte Neighborhood.
Andean Region
 Bogotá — 93 Park, 7th Av, 15th Av, 116th Av, 119th Av, 122nd Av, 11th Av, Zona T, Zona Rosa, Centro Andino.
 Medellín — Via Primavera, El Poblado.
 Pereira — Circunvalar Ave, 6th Ave.
 Manizales — 22nd Ave, 23rd Ave.
 Armenia, Quindio — Bolivar Ave, Zona Norte.
 Bucaramanga — San Pío Park, Cabecera.
 Cucuta — Venezuela Boundary, Ventura Plaza.
Caribbean Region
 Cartagena de Indias — Downtown, San Martín Ave, Bocagrande.
 Barranquilla — Paseo Bolivar.
 Montería — Ronda del Sinú Lineal Park.
 Valledupar — Alfonso Lopez Square.
 Sincelejo — Majagual Square.
 Riohacha — Beach Pier.
 Santa Marta — El Rodadero.
 Maicao — Street 16
 Mompox — Mompox Plaza.
Insular Region
 North End — Colombia Ave, Colón Ave.
Orinoquia Region
 Villavicencio — Urban Spring Square
 Yopal — Iguana Park
Pacific Region
 Cali — 6th North Ave.
 Buenaventura — Cascajal Island.
 Quibdo — Atrato River Park.

Paraguay
 Asunción — Calle Palma, Villa Morra (Senador Long, Lillo, and Malutín streets), Manora (Shopping del Sol mall and surroundings), Recoleta (Shopping Mariscal Lopez mall and surroundings), Av. España.

Peru
 Arequipa — Avenida del Ejército in Cayma District.
 Cusco — Avenida El Sol in Cusco District and Avenida La Cultura in Wanchaq District.
 Lima — Jirón de la Unión in Lima District, Avenida Larco and Larcomar in Miraflores District, Jirón Agustín Gamarra in La Victoria District, Jockey Plaza in Santiago de Surco District, Avenida Conquistadores and Avenida Petit Thouars in San Isidro District.
 Trujillo — Jirón Francisco Pizarro in Trujillo District.

Uruguay
 Montevideo — 18 de Julio Avenue, Avenida Italia, Avenida Alfredo Arocena, Avenida Dr. Luis Alberto de Herrera, Peatonal Sarandí
 Salto — Calle Uruguay
 Punta del Este — Avenida Gorlero, Calle 20
 Ciudad de la Costa — Avenida Ing. Luis Giannattasio

Venezuela
 Caracas — Las Mercedes, Altamira, El Hatillo, Sabana Grande, La Candelaria, El Rosal 
 Maracaibo — El Milagro
 Valencia — El Viñedo
 Maracay — Las Delicias
 Puerto La Cruz — Paseo Colon

Oceania

Australia
Queensland
 Brisbane — Queen Street Mall, Edward Street, Brisbane, Little Stanley Street, Brunswick Street
 Noosa Heads — Hastings Street
New South Wales
Sydney — Pitt Street Mall, Market Street, Oxford Street, Castlereagh Street, Double Bay, King Street, George Street, Victoria Avenue, The Corso, Hay Street
South Australia
 Adelaide — Rundle Mall, Rundle Street, North Terrace
 Burnside — Burnside Village
 Unley — King William Road
 Netherby — Fullarton Road
 Parkside — Glen Osmond Road
 Norwood — The Parade
 Semaphore — Semaphore Road
Northern Territory
Darwin — Smith Street Mall
Tasmania
Hobart — Liverpool Street, Elizabeth Street Mall, Collins Street, Salamanca Place
Victoria
Melbourne — Collins Street, Bourke Street, Flinders Lane, Chapel Street, Glenferrie Road - Hawthorn, Burke Road - Camberwell, Bridge Road - Richmond, Acland Street- St Kilda
Western Australia
 Perth — King Street, Hay Street, Murray Street

New Zealand
 Auckland — Queen Street, Ponsonby Road
 Christchurch — Cashel Street
 Dunedin — George Street, Stuart Street
 Hamilton — Victoria Street
 Wellington — Lambton Quay, Cuba Street

See also
 List of shopping malls by country

References

External links

 City Mayors: List of Shopping Streets

 
Lists of streets
Lists by city
Lists of roads
Retailing-related lists
Shopping streets